The Immortal is an isometric action-adventure game originally created for the Apple IIGS. It was soon ported to the Amiga, Atari ST, DOS, Nintendo Entertainment System, and Genesis. A wizard is attempting to find his mentor in a large and dangerous labyrinth. It has a high degree of graphic violence. In 2020, it was re-released for Nintendo Switch.

Plot
The wizard Mordamir calls for help from deep below the labyrinth, attempting to communicate with a man named Dunric. The player, an elderly wizard, instead discovers the message and takes on the quest to rescue Mordamir, his mentor and master. While descending the levels of the labyrinth, a race of Goblins and trolls at war are encountered, and the goblins allies with the player after sparing their king. The player also encounters many other hostile creatures within the labyrinth, including invisible Shades, Will-o'-the-wisp, flesh-eating slime, flying lizards,  
man-eating worms, a giant spider and a water Norlac. The player is assisted along the way by the warrior Ulindor, Mordamir's servant and body guard. As well as a mysterious merchant selling helpful potions and magical items.

Throughout the journey, the player sleeps on straw beds placed throughout the labyrinth, where dreams reveal an ancient civilization of peaceful dragons that once lived in the dungeon labyrinth below. Visions are also seen of the walled-off ancient city of Erinoch, with its abundant fountains of youth and eternally young inhabitants. The dragons governed the city's source of fountain water from below, but the rulers of Erinoch planned a siege against the dragons for control of the enchanted water. Mordamir presented to the city's counsel a weapon he created to kill all the dragons but was unable to use it, for a reason unknown.

As the player nears the bottom of the labyrinth, he finds the trapped and dying Dunric, who explains Mordamir was never a prisoner, but instead kidnapped his daughter to lure him into the labyrinth as a trap. In a dream vision it is revealed the entire race of dragons were wiped out by the city's army in a fierce battle, except for one that escaped the dungeon labyrinth and returned to the destroy the city and all its inhabitants. Mordamir, 1,000 years later, is the only survivor of his civilization, as is the one last dragon. In the end the player is confronted by both the dragon and Mordamir in a final conflict.

Gameplay
The game takes place on a labyrinth with 8 levels (7 levels on the Nintendo version). The player must solve puzzles, avoid deathtraps, use magic spells, and acquire various items. Certain items will bring instant death to the player if used unwisely. Some magical items and objects can be purchased from a merchant character in certain levels, using gold pieces acquired.

A variety of non-player characters wander or protect a specific portion of the map. Fireball spells can be freely used to dispatch these enemies on the isometric field but not in combat mode, which is initiated upon touching them. The player can dodge, and swing and stab with a sword. Certain levels allow the player to possess a flying magic carpet, cast a levitation spell, and paddle a floating barrel.

Development
Will Harvey had started development on an Apple II game to be called Campaign, intended to become an online multiplayer RPG. As its story developed, it became a single-player game only. The music for the Apple IIGS version was composed by Douglas Fulton. On some conversions, Rob Hubbard and Michael Bartlow are credited.

Reception

Computer Gaming World praised The Immortals graphics, but stated that the game was really an arcade game as it was too linear to succeed as an RPG. It criticized the use of save points and the controls, and concluded that the game "misses the target". In 1992, Dragon gave the game 4 out of 5 stars. Computer and Video Games magazine was positive about the graphics and control scheme and gave an overall score of 93 out of 100.

Amiga Power was mixed, awarding the game 76% and criticising its completely linear nature and lack of replay value, while identifying the graphics as a strength.

It has been reviewed in The One for ST Games, The One for Amiga Games, VideoGame, Computer and Video Games, CU Amiga, ACE (Advanced Computer Entertainment), Datormagazin, Your Amiga, The One, Mean Machines, Zero, Joystick, Zero, The One Amiga, ST Format, Amiga Computing, Raze, Australian Commodore and Amiga Review, Amiga Format, Zzap!, Amiga Action ASM (Aktueller Software Markt), ST Format, Enchanted Realms, Amiga Joker, and Amiga Power.

References

External links 

1990 video games
Action-adventure games
Amiga games
Apple IIGS games
Atari ST games
Dark fantasy video games
DOS games
Dungeon crawler video games
Electronic Arts games
Nintendo Entertainment System games
Sega Genesis games
Single-player video games
Video games about old age
Video games scored by Rob Hubbard
Video games about witchcraft
Video games with isometric graphics
Nintendo Switch Online games
Video games developed in the United States